The Dalmatian National Party may refer to:
 Dalmatian National Party (1874) - the party of that name founded in 1874.
 Dalmatian National Party (1990) - the party of that name founded in 1990.